The Beijing–Yuanping or Jingyuan railway, is a railroad in northern China between Beijing, the national capital, and Yuanping in Shanxi Province. The Beijing–Yuanping railway was built between 1965 and 1971, and entered into operation in 1973. At the time of its construction, the line was primarily intended to transport coal from Shanxi and move military assets in the event of a national defense emergency. The line runs almost entirely in mountainous terrain. Major cities and landmarks along the route include Beijing, Laiyuan, Lingqiu, Fanshi, Dai County and Yuanping.

Route
In Beijing, the Jingyuan Line begins at the Shijingshan South Railway Station, a junction with the Fengtai–Shacheng railway in Fengtai District west of the city, and runs westward through Shijingshan District and Fangshan Districts into the Western Hills.  The line passes Zhoukoudian and follows the gorge of Juma River from Sandu in western Fangshan, upriver to Laiyuan in Hebei Province.  Along the way, the line passes through scenic areas including Shidu, the Great Wall at Zijingguan, and the Eastern Qing Tombs.  From Laiyuan, the line continues westward through the Taihang Mountains into Shanxi.  West of Lingqiu, the line follows the Hutuo River into the Yiding Basin, where the line runs between the Heng and Wutai Mountains to Dai County and Yuanping.  At Yuanping, the line connects to the Datong–Puzhou railway.

History
The Beijing–Yuanping railway was planned and built by the People's Liberation Army Rail Corps. In June 1965, the Rail Corps assigned its 4th and 13th Divisions to begin preparatory work in Fangshan and Laiyuan, but the 13th Division was reassigned to support North Vietnam in the Vietnam War and the 14th Division was ordered to take its place. By spring 1967, the work began on the Yimaling and Pingxingguan Tunnels.
Due to the mountainous terrain, the line has 120 tunnels that are collectively  in length and 216 bridges that are collectively  in length.  The Cultural Revolution caused disruption and shortage of materials which delayed the completion of the railway, originally scheduled for 1970. The laying of tracks was completed on October 30, 1971.  In 1973, the rail line officially entered into operations.

Rail connections
Shijingshan South: Fengtai–Shacheng railway
Yuanping: Datong–Puzhou railway

See also
 List of railways in China

References

Railway lines in China
Rail transport in Beijing
Rail transport in Hebei
Rail transport in Shanxi